Aces 'N' Eights is a 2008 American Western television film from RHI Entertainment, starring Casper Van Dien, Bruce Boxleitner and Ernest Borgnine. It is directed by Craig R. Baxley and written by Ronald M. Cohen and Dennis Shryack. Aces 'n Eights first aired on ION on March 15, 2008 in the US and on June 5, 2008 in the UK. A DVD release of the film was released by Genius Entertainment in May 2008.

Premise
Already taking a gamble settling in the uncharted west, the peaceful settlers of a town destined for railroad greatness suddenly find themselves being ruthlessly shot down. With no law and order to be found, justice falls onto the shoulders of an elderly rancher (played by Ernest Borgnine) and an accomplished but retired gunslinger (played by Casper Van Dien).

Cast
 Casper Van Dien as Luke Rivers
 Ernest Borgnine as Thurmond Prescott
 Bruce Boxleitner as D.C. Cracker
 Deirdre Quinn as Jo Tanner
 Jack Noseworthy as Riley
 Jake Thomas as Noah
 Jeff Kober as Tate
 William Atherton as Howard

References

External links
 RHI Entertainment: "Aces n' Eights"
 
 
 

2008 films
2008 television films
American Western (genre) television films
2008 action drama films
2000s English-language films
American action drama films
Films about bullying
Films about violence
Films directed by Craig R. Baxley
Murder in films
Sonar Entertainment films
Torture in films
Revisionist Western (genre) films